Pierre Montazel (5 March 1911 – 8 September 1975) was a French cinematographer and screenwriter.

Selected filmography
 Vidocq (1939)
 Sing Anyway (1940)
 The Pavilion Burns (1941)
 The Wolf of the Malveneurs (1943)
 Majestic Hotel Cellars (1945)
 Devil and the Angel (1946)
 Six Hours to Lose (1947)
 Counter Investigation (1947)
 Antoine and Antoinette (1947)
 Cruise for the Unknown One (1948)
 I Like Only You (1949)
 Not Any Weekend for Our Love (1950)
 Paris Still Sings (1951)
 Judgement of God (1952)
 Touchez pas au grisbi (1954)
 Royal Affairs in Versailles (1954)
 Gas-Oil (1955)
 I'll Get Back to Kandara (1956)
 Charming Boys (1957)
 Anyone Can Kill Me (1957)
 Burning Fuse (1957)
 The Cat (1958)
 Du rififi chez les femmes (1959)
 The Cat Shows Her Claws (1960)
 The Troops on Vacation (1970)

References

External links

1911 births
1975 deaths
French cinematographers
French film directors
French male screenwriters
20th-century French screenwriters
20th-century French male writers